Elephas beyeri is an extinct species of dwarf elephant belonging to the Elephantidae family of the Middle Pleistocene. It was named after the anthropologist H. Otley Beyer. The type specimen was discovered on Cabarruyan Island in The Philippines but has since been lost.

Overview 

Elephas beyeri was a dwarf elephant with a probable estimated stature of 1.2 m in shoulder height. During its naming, von Koenigswald proposed that these dwarfed elephants were descendants of the Elephas namadicus (Palaeoloxodon) lineage. It was thought by von Koenigswald that these animals crossed from the mainland Asia to the Philippines via land bridge connecting with Taiwan. This, however, is still debated but a research in 2021 showed an evidence of the possibility. Aside from the missing initial specimen, another confirmed discovery were unearthed in 2001 in the same locality. Further possible fossils were found in the Visayas and at a number of sites in Luzon. But it is unclear if these belonged to E. beyeri or E. namadicus due to their fragmented nature and the missing holotype. It might be even argued that the Visayan fossils were different from the Elephant races harbored in the Greater Luzon.

References

Prehistoric proboscideans
Fossil taxa described in 1956